A Skylit Drive is an American post-hardcore band from Lodi, California, formed in 2005. They have released four studio albums, one acoustic album, one extended play, eight singles, one video album, and fourteen music videos, under the labels Tragic Hero Records and Fearless Records.

Albums

Studio albums

Acoustic albums

Extended plays

Singles

Videography

Video albums

Music videos

References

Discographies of American artists